"That that is is that that is not is not is that it it is" is a grammatically correct English word sequence demonstrating syntactic ambiguity. It is used as an example illustrating the importance of proper punctuation.

The sequence can be understood as any of four grammatically correct sequences, each with at least three discrete sentences, by adding punctuation:

The first, second, and fourth sentences relate a simple philosophical proverb in the style of Parmenides stating: that all that is is; and that anything that does not exist does not. The phrase was noted in Brewer's Dictionary of Phrase and Fable.

This phrase appeared in the 1968 American movie Charly, written to demonstrate punctuation to the main character Charly's teacher, in a scene to demonstrate that the surgical operation to make the character smarter had succeeded.

See also
 Buffalo buffalo Buffalo buffalo buffalo buffalo Buffalo buffalo
 Colorless green ideas sleep furiously
 James while John had had had had had had had had had had had a better effect on the teacher
 List of linguistic example sentences

References 

English phrases
Language games
Psycholinguistics
Ambiguity
Linguistic example sentences